Fred Nixon (born September 22, 1958) is an American former footballer who played as a wide receiver for the National Football League (NFL).

Biography
Nixon was born Frederick Lenar Nixon on September 22, 1958 in Camilla, Georgia, United States.

College career
He played at the collegiate level at the University of Oklahoma.

Professional career

Green Bay Packers
Nixon was drafted by the Green Bay Packers in the fourth round of the 1980 NFL Draft and played two seasons with the team. He returned for a third season, but was placed on the injured reserve list with a stress fracture of the foot on August 24, 1982 through the entire 1982 season. The Packers released him on March 2, 1983.

Oklahoma Outlaws
Nixon signed with the Oklahoma Outlaws of the USFL on October 11, 1983. On January 26, 1984, while at training camp in Tampa, Florida he was hospitalized with heat exhaustion. Shortly after his illness, Nixon retired from the team.

Orlando Renegades
Nixon signed with the Orlando Renegades of the USFL in November 1984.

See also
List of Green Bay Packers players

References

1958 births
Living people
People from Camilla, Georgia
Green Bay Packers players
American football wide receivers
University of Oklahoma alumni
Oklahoma Sooners football players